The Lord Lieutenant of Wales was an office associated with the Lord President of the Council of Wales and the Marches until the abolition of that body in 1689. The Lord Presidents of Wales were also Lord Lieutenants of Wales, except for the years 1602–1629, when the county of Glamorgan (as well as the Marcher county of Monmouthshire) formed a separate lieutenancy. Before the English Civil War, the Lord Presidents were also Lord Lieutenant of Herefordshire, Monmouthshire, Shropshire and Worcestershire, except as mentioned above; however, this practice did not continue after the English Restoration in 1660.

The last Lord President, Charles Gerard, 1st Earl of Macclesfield, retained the Lord-Lieutenancy of all Wales until his death in 1694, when the counties of North Wales were placed under William Stanley, 9th Earl of Derby and South Wales under Thomas Herbert, 8th Earl of Pembroke.

Lord Lieutenants of Wales

References
 

1694 disestablishments in Wales
Local government in Wales